Elena Viktorovna Brejniva (born 4 January 1990) is a Russian professional racing cyclist. She rode at the 2012, 2014 and 2015 UCI Track Cycling World Championships.

Career results

2011
2nd Team Sprint, UEC European U23 Track Championships (with Ekaterina Gnidenko)
2012
UEC European U23 Track Championships
2nd Keirin
2nd 500m Time Trial
2013
Grand Prix of Russian Helicopters
3rd Keirin
3rd Sprint
3rd Team Sprint (with Olga Hudenko)
2014
UEC European Track Championships
1st  Team Sprint (with Anastasia Voynova and Daria Shmeleva)
2nd Keirin
2nd Team Sprint, Grand Prix of Tula (with Olga Streltsova)
2nd Team Sprint, Memorial of Alexander Lesnikov (with Olga Streltsova)
2nd 500m Time Trial, Cottbuser SprintCup
3rd Keirin, GP von Deutschland im Sprint
Grand Prix of Russian Helicopters
3rd Keirin
3rd Sprint
2015
Panevezys
2nd 500m Time Trial
3rd Keirin
3rd Sprint
Grand Prix Minsk
1st Team Sprint (with Victoria Tyumneva)
2nd 500m Time Trial
3rd Team Sprint, Grand Prix of Tula (with Victoria Tyumneva)

References

External links

1990 births
Living people
Russian female cyclists
Place of birth missing (living people)
20th-century Russian women
21st-century Russian women